Knocks is a townland to the east of Lisnaskea in County Fermanagh, Northern Ireland. It is situated in the historic barony of Magherastephana and the civil parish of Aghalurcher and covers an area of 193 acres.

The name "The Knocks" is locally applied to a larger area around the townland. There is a primary school, St. Eugene's,  and a more recently established community centre.

See also
 List of townlands in County Fermanagh

References

Townlands of County Fermanagh
Civil parish of Aghalurcher